Chub Lake is a lake in Dakota County, Minnesota, United States.

The lake was named after the chub fish.

References

External links
Lake information report

Lakes of Dakota County, Minnesota
Lakes of Minnesota